George William Henry Venables-Vernon, 7th Baron Vernon PC (25 February 1854 – 15 December 1898), styled The Honourable George Venables-Vernon from 1866 to 1883, was a British Liberal politician. He served as Captain of the Honourable Corps of Gentlemen-at-Arms under William Gladstone from 1892 to 1894.

Background

Political career
Vernon sat on the Liberal benches in the House of Lords and served in the last Liberal administration of William Ewart Gladstone as Captain of the Honourable Corps of Gentlemen-at-Arms from 1892 to 1894. In 1892 he was sworn of the Privy Council.

Family

Lord Vernon married Frances Margaret Lawrance, daughter of Francis Lawrance, of New York City, in 1885. He died in December 1898, aged 44, and was succeeded in the barony by his eldest son, George.

References

1854 births
1898 deaths
Honourable Corps of Gentlemen at Arms
Members of the Privy Council of the United Kingdom
George 7